HMS Berwick was a 70-gun third-rate ship of the line of the Royal Navy, built by Joseph Allin the younger to the 1733 proposals of the 1719 Establishment at Deptford Dockyard, and launched on 13 June 1743. It participated in the Battle of Toulon on 22–23 February 1744 under the command of Sir Edward Hawke.

She was a part of the attack on Guadeloupe against Fort Louis (now Fort George), at Point à Pitre by a squadron, detached from Commodore Moore and commanded by Captain Wm. Harman of Berwick on 14 February 1759.

Berwick was broken up in 1760.

Notes

References

 Lavery, Brian (2003) The Ship of the Line - Volume 1: The development of the battlefleet 1650-1850. Conway Maritime Press. .

Ships of the line of the Royal Navy
1743 ships